Claes Fredrik Richardson Wersäll (born 30 April 1951) is a Swedish jurist and civil servant who has been the Marshal of the Realm of Sweden and chief of the Royal Court of Sweden since 1 September 2018.

Wersäll was educated at Uppsala University, graduating in 1976 with a candidate of law. He was Prosecutor-General of Sweden from 2004 to 2008 and President of the Svea Court of Appeal from 2008 to 2018. He was appointed Marshal of the Realm of Sweden by King Carl XVI Gustaf on 15 January 2018 and took office on 1 September 2018.

Honours

National honours
 H. M. The King's Medal of the 12th size gold medal worn around the neck on a chain of gold (silver-gilt) (2013)

Foreign honours
 Knight Grand Cross of the Order of Merit of the Italian Republic (14 January 2019)
: Grand Cross 1st Class of the Order of Merit of the Federal Republic of Germany (7 September 2021)
: Knight Grand Cross of the Order of Isabella the Catholic (16 November 2021)
: Grand Cross of the Order of the White Rose (17 May 2022)
: Grand Cross of the Order of Orange-Nassau (11 October 2022)

References

External links 

|-

Academic staff of Uppsala University
1951 births
Living people
Swedish jurists
Marshals of the Realm
Uppsala University alumni